Falamani Mafi (born 6 March 1971, in Kanokupolu) is a Tongan former rugby union player. He played as lock

Career
His first cap for Tonga was against Australia, in Brisbane, on 4 July 1993. He was also part of the 1995 Rugby World Cup Tonga squad coached by Fakahau Valu, where Mafi played two matches in the tournament. During the match against France, Mafi stomped the French player Philippe Benetton, however, his team mate Feleti Mahoni was sent off instead. Mafi also played in the 1999 Rugby World Cup, playing against New Zealand, Italy and England, the latter being his last international cap for Tonga.

Notes

External links
Falamani Mafi international stats 

1971 births
Living people
People from Tongatapu
Tongan rugby union players
Tonga international rugby union players
Tongan expatriates in Australia
Tongan expatriates in Japan
Rugby union locks